Fantastic Planet (lit. "The Wild Planet") is a 1973 experimental independent adult animated science fiction art film, directed by René Laloux and written by Laloux and Roland Topor, the latter of whom also completed the film's production design. The film was animated at Jiří Trnka Studio in Prague. The film was an international co-production between companies from France and Czechoslovakia. The allegorical story, about humans living on a strange planet dominated by giant humanoid aliens who consider them animals, is based on the 1957 novel Oms en série by French writer Stefan Wul.

A working title while in development was Sur la planète Ygam (On the Planet Ygam), which is where most of the story takes place; the actual title (The Fantastic/Savage Planet) is the name of Ygam's moon. Production began in 1963. Fantastic Planet was awarded the Grand Prix special jury prize at the 1973 Cannes Film Festival, and in 2016, it was ranked the 36th greatest animated movie ever by Rolling Stone.

Plot
In the distant future, the gargantuan blue humanoid Traags (in French and Czech spelling: Draag) have brought human beings (who are called Oms as a play on the French word for "man", homme) from Earth to the planet Ygam, where they maintain a technologically and spiritually advanced society. The Traags consider Oms animals, and while they keep some as pets, others live in the wilderness and are periodically slaughtered by the Traags to control their population. Traags have much longer lifespans than Oms, but reproduce much less.

When an Om mother is tortured to death by three Traag children, her orphaned infant is found by Master Sinh, a key Traag leader, and his daughter Tiwa, who keeps the boy as a pet and names him Terr. Tiwa loves Terr and is careful not to hurt him, but, in accordance with her parents' instructions, gives him a collar with which she can pull him in any direction. She brings Terr to sessions in which she receives her education using a headset that transmits knowledge into her mind; a defect in Terr's collar allows him to receive the knowledge too. Around the time that Tiwa grows into her teens and first performs Traag meditation, which allows the species to travel with their minds, she loses some interest in Terr, who has become a young man and acquired much Traag knowledge. He escapes into the wilderness, stealing Tiwa's headset.

There he runs into a wild female Om, who cuts off his collar and introduces him to her tribe, which lives in an abandoned Traag park full of strange creatures and landscapes. Terr shows them how to use the headset to acquire Traag knowledge and literacy, winning the right to do so in a duel. The literacy they gain allows them to read a Traag announcement that the park will be purged of Oms, and, when the purge comes, some are slaughtered by Traag technology while others escape, joining forces with another tribe. They are attacked by two Traag passers-by and manage to kill one of them before escaping to an abandoned Traag rocket depot, much to the outrage of Traag leaders.

They live there for years, joined by many other Oms. Due to the knowledge acquired from Terr's headset, they manage to replicate Traag technology, including two rockets; they hope to leave Ygam for its moon, the Fantastic Planet, and live there safe from Traags. When a large-scale Traag purge hits the depot and many Oms are slaughtered, a group led by Terr uses the rockets to flee to the Fantastic Planet, where they discover large statues that Traags travel to during meditation and use to meet beings from other galaxies in a strange mating ritual that maintains their species. The Oms destroy some of the statues, threatening the Traags' existence; the genocide of Oms is halted on Ygam, and, facing a crisis, the Traags negotiate for peace. The Oms agree to leave the Fantastic Planet to the Traags for their meditations, and in return, an artificial satellite is put into orbit around Ygam and given to the Oms as a new home. This leads to an era of peaceful coexistence between the two species, who now benefit from each other's way of thinking.

Voice cast

Additional voices
French: Sylvie Lenoir, Michèle Chahan, Hubert de Lapparent, Claude Joseph, Philippe Ogouz, Jacques Ruisseau, Max Amyl, Madeleine Clervannes, William Coryn, Poupy de Monneron, Christian de Tillière, Christian Echelard, Jeanine Forney, Pascal Kominakis, Andre Lambert, Serge Netter, Yvette Robin, André Rouyer, Irina Tarason, Julien Thomas, Gilbert Vilhon, Paul Villé
English: Nora Heflin, Monika Ramirez

Soundtrack

The film's score was composed by Alain Goraguer. In a review for AllMusic, François Couture noted:

The soundtrack was originally pressed on vinyl during the mid-70's in France. These original pressings command a high dollar on the secondary market given the soundtrack's limited release. In 2000, DC Recordings released the soundtrack on CD, and the soundtrack was later reissued on LP.

Track listing

Interpretations
The film's narrative has been considered to be an allegory about animal rights and human rights, as well as racism. Sean Axmaker of Turner Classic Movies referred to the film as "nothing if not allegorical", writing that "it's not a stretch to see the fight against oppression reflected in the civil rights struggle in the United States, the French in Algeria, apartheid in South Africa, and (when injustice takes a turn to wholesale annihilation of the 'inferior' race) the Holocaust itself".

Liz Ohanesian of LA Weekly speculated on the film being a commentary on animal rights, using the Traag's treatment of the Oms as evidence and writing that the film places "humans in roles of pets and pests". Mike D'Angelo of The A.V. Club wrote that "The Traag-Om dynamic is broad enough to be multipurpose, reflecting both racism and animal rights via 'How would you like it?' role reversal".

Reception and legacy

Box office
The film was reported to have a total of 809,945 admissions in France.

Critical response
Fantastic Planet has received generally positive reviews. On the review aggregation website Rotten Tomatoes, the film has an approval rating of 91% based on 32 reviews with an average rating of 7.24/10. The site's critical consensus reads "Fantastic Planet is an animated epic that is by turns surreal and lovely, fantastic and graceful".

Howard Thompson of The New York Times wrote that the film offers "original, thoughtful, often strong (but tasteful) animation". Kevin Thomas of the Los Angeles Times called it "disquieting, eerie and vastly imaginative." Gene Siskel of the Chicago Tribune, on the other hand, gave the film one-and-a-half stars out of four and called it "an animated piece of science-fiction pretending to be a Meaningful Statement … According to publicists for the film, the visuals and story begin to make sense if your mind is chemically altered. I doubt it."

Among retrospective reviews, Carson Lund of Slant Magazine gave the film a score of three-and-a-half out of five possible stars, writing that "by the film’s conclusion, it’s hard to feel comfortable with similar episodes on our own imperfect planet". Mike D'Angelo of The A.V. Club gave the film a rating of "B+", writing that "Fantastic Planet [should] seem extremely dated, yet it’s ultimately too singular to feel beholden to a particular era. It truly earns the adjective in its title". Alan Morrison of Empire gave the film four out of five stars and called it "Surreal and wonderful in a way not often seen from Europe".

Maitland McDonagh of TV Guide gave the film three out of four stars, calling it an "Eerie, surreal and a welcome respite from Disney-style animation". Scott Thill of Wired called the film "a sterling example of the trippy animation ambition of the late '60s and early '70s". Gary Dauphin of The Village Voice wrote that "Although the visuals are worth the ticket alone, Fantastic Planet also crackles with emotional and political resonance". Paul Trandahl of Common Sense Media gave the film a rating of four out of five stars, calling the film "A jarring examination of racism and intolerance".

In 2016, Fantastic Planet was ranked the 36th greatest animated movie ever by Rolling Stone.

Accolades
The film won the Special Prize at the 1973 Cannes Film Festival.

Home media
Following various public domain VHS releases of the film, it was released by Anchor Bay Entertainment on VHS and DVD on 16 February 1999. In 2006, Eureka Entertainment released the film on DVD in the United States as #34 in their Masters of Cinema line. It was released on Blu-ray in 2012.

On 23 October 2007, Facets Video and Accent Cinema released a newly restored version on DVD, including many bonus features never available before. In June 2016, the Criterion Collection released the film on Blu-ray and DVD.

References

External links
 
 
 
 
 Links to further resources
 Link to Masters Of Cinema
Fantastic Planet: Gambous Amalga an essay by Michael Brooke at the Criterion Collection

1970s science fiction films
1970s dystopian films
1973 films
1973 animated films
1970s French animated films
Animated films based on novels
Animated films about extraterrestrial life
Czech animated science fiction films
French-language Czech films
Fantastic art
Films based on French novels
Films based on science fiction novels
Films set on fictional planets
French animated science fiction films
Films directed by René Laloux
Films about giants
Films about racism
Surrealist films
1970s stop-motion animated films
Films set in the future
Films scored by Alain Goraguer
Films produced by Anatole Dauman
Cutout animation films
Stefan Wul
Roland Topor
1970s French-language films
French adult animated films
Czech adult animated films
1973 independent films